Arancini are Italian rice balls that are stuffed, coated with breadcrumbs and deep fried, and are a staple of Sicilian cuisine. The most common arancini fillings are: al ragù or al sugo, filled with ragù (meat or mince, slow-cooked at low temperature with tomato sauce and spices), mozzarella or caciocavallo cheese, and often peas, and al burro or ô burru, filled with ham and mozzarella or besciamella.

A number of regional variants exist which differ in their fillings and shape. Arancini al ragù produced in eastern Sicily have a conical shape inspired by the volcano Etna.

Etymology

In Sicilian, arancini is grammatically plural. The corresponding singular is either the masculine arancinu or the feminine arancina. The eastern side of Sicily tends to use the masculine form, while the western side tends to use the feminine form.

In Italian, the masculine  (pl. arancini) form has become prevalent, even though the feminine form  (pl. arancine) can also be used.

History

Arancini are said to have originated in 10th-century Sicily, at a time when the island was under Arab rule. Its origins may therefore be possibly the same as kibbeh of the Levantine cuisine.

In the cities of Palermo, Siracusa, and Trapani in Sicily, arancini are a traditional food for the feast of Santa Lucia on 13 December, when bread and pasta are not eaten. This commemorates the arrival of a grain supply ship on Santa Lucia's day in 1646, relieving a severe famine.

Today, with the increasing popularity of this finger food in modern Italian food culture, arancini are found all year round at most Sicilian food outlets, particularly in Palermo, Messina and Catania. The dish was traditionally created to provide a full meal to Federico II di Svevia during his hunting activities.

Ingredients and variations

The most common type of arancini sold in Sicilian cafés are arancini cû sucu (it. arancini al ragù), which typically consist of meat in a tomato sauce, rice, and mozzarella or other cheese. Many cafés also offer arancini cû burru (it. arancini al burro, with butter or béchamel sauce) or specialty arancini, such as arancini chî funci (it. arancini ai funghi, with mushrooms), arancini câ fastuca (it. arancini al pistacchio, with pistachios), or arancini â norma (it. arancini alla norma, with aubergine).

In Roman cuisine, supplì'' are similar but are commonly filled with cheese (different preparation methods and filling distribution). In Naples, rice balls are called . In a variant recipe originating among the Italian diaspora in Southeast Texas, the arancini are stuffed with a chili-seasoned filling.

In popular culture
In Italian literature, Inspector Montalbano, the main character of Andrea Camilleri's detective novels, is a well-known lover of arancini – especially those made by Adelina Cirrinciò, his housekeeper and cook. The success of the book series and the television adaptation has contributed to making this dish known outside of Italy.

See also

Italian cuisine
Sicilian cuisine
List of Sicilian dishes
 List of stuffed dishes
Pani ca meusa – another example of Sicilian street food

Notes

References

External links

Arancino recipe at BBC Food

Italian rice dishes
Palermitan cuisine
Messina
Cuisine of Messina
Cuisine of Sicily
Cuisine of New York City
Stuffed dishes
Italian-American culture in New York City
Street food in Italy